Lake Villa Township is located in northwestern Lake County, Illinois. The population was 40,276 at the 2010 census.

Geography
Geologically, it is a region of glacial till, with numerous glacial lakes and wetlands. Principal lakes are Cedar Lake, Deep Lake, Crooked Lake, Sand Lake, Miltmore Lake, and Fourth Lake.

Cities and towns
 Antioch (small portions)
 Grayslake (small portion)
 Lake Villa (central areas)
 Lindenhurst (vast majority)
 Old Mill Creek (small parts)
 Round Lake Beach (north third)
 Round Lake Heights (north half)

Unincorporated areas
 Fox Lake Hills
 Ingleside (all parts east to Hazelwood Drive)
 Venetian Village

Adjacent townships
 Antioch Township (northwest, north)
 Newport Township (northeast)
 Warren Township (southeast)
 Avon Township (south)
 Grant Township (southwest)

Demographics

History
Lake Villa Township was created in 1913 from parts of Antioch, Avon, and Grant townships. Early settlements, long predating the creation of the township, included Monaville and Stanwood. In 1883, the Chicago businessman Ernst Johann Lehmann bought  in Stanwood, had the name changed to Lake Villa, and established the Lake Villa Hotel. Lehmann encouraged the Wisconsin Central Railroad Company to lay its new railway through the area, and in 1886 the new line opened with a station in Lake Villa. The Lehmann family would come to dominate the immediate area, for a time.

The railroad acted as a spur to enterprise beyond the farming which was the mainstay of the larger region. Resorting was the principal industry in the township into the 1930s. Prior to modern refrigeration, ice cutting drew seasonal labor.

The most important development following the Lehmann era was probably the creation of the village of Lindenhurst, subdivided by N. H. Engle and Sons in 1952 on the former Lehmann estate. The village was incorporated in 1956 and quickly became a force in the township.

Over the past decade the township landscape has become increasingly marked by subdivisions and strip malls, with a corresponding reduction in farm- and woodland. However, large areas of green space have been preserved by the Lake County Forest Preserves; units include Duck Farm, Grant Woods, Hastings Lake, and MacDonald Woods.

Government officials
Township supervisor: Dan Venturi
Township clerk: Jean K Smuda
Township trustees: Glenn McCollum, Terry Beadle, Paul Berker, Barbara Stout
Township highways: Jim Jorgensen
Township assessor: Jeffrey Lee

Notes

References
Brysiewicz, Joseph W. Chicago's metropolitan fringe: Lake Villa, Illinois: the construction of multiple historical narratives. Lake Forest, Illinois: Lake Forest College, 2001.
Brysiewicz, Joseph W. Lake Villa Township, Illinois. Chicago: Arcadia Publications, 2001.

External links 

US Census
City-data.com
Illinois State Archives
Lake County Forest Preserves
Lake Villa Public Library District
Village of Lake Villa
Village of Lindenhurst
Village of Round Lake Beach
Village of Round Lake Heights

Townships in Illinois
Townships in Lake County, Illinois